The Military Administration in Belgium and Northern France was an interim occupation authority established during the Second World War by Nazi Germany that included present-day Belgium and the French departments of Nord and Pas-de-Calais. The administration was also responsible for governing the zone interdite, a narrow strip of territory running along the French northern and eastern borders. It remained in existence until July 1944. Plans to transfer Belgium from the military administration to a civilian administration were promoted by the SS, and Hitler had been ready to do so until Autumn 1942, when he put off the plans for what was intended to be temporary but ended up being permanent until the end of German occupation. The SS had suggested either Josef Terboven or Ernst Kaltenbrunner as the Reich Commissioner of the civilian administration.

Reichskommissariat
On 18 July 1944, the Military Administration was replaced by a civil one, led by the Gauleiter, Josef Grohé, who was named the Reichskommissar of the Reichskommissariat of Belgium and Northern France (Reichskommissariat Belgien und Nordfrankreich)

Role of collaborationist groups
The Nazi administration was assisted by fascist Flemish, Walloon, and French collaborationists. In binational Belgian territory, the predominantly French region of Wallonia, the collaborationist Rexists provided aid to the Nazis while in Flemish-populated Flanders, the Flemish National Union supported the Nazis. In Northern France, Flemish separatist tendencies were stirred by the pro-Nazi Vlaamsch Verbond van Frankrijk led by priest Jean-Marie Gantois.

The attachment of the departments Nord and Pas-de-Calais to the military administration in Brussels was initially made on military considerations, and was supposedly done in preparation for the planned invasion of Britain. Ultimately, the attachment was based on Hitler's intention to move the Reich's border westward, and was also used to maintain pressure on the Vichy regime – which protested the curtailment of its authority in what was still de jure national French territory – to ensure its good behavior.

Command structure
The Military Administration formed the core of a wider command structure which allowed the governance of occupied Belgium. It could rely on both military and civilian components:

See also

 Battle of Belgium
 Belgium in World War II
 Reichsgau Flandern
 Reichsgau Wallonien
 District of Brussels

References

Further reading

External links
  Militärbefehlshaber Belgien/Nordfrankreich: Gliederung (administrative structure) at Lexikon der Wehrmacht

World War II occupied territories
Belgium and Northern France
1944 disestablishments in Belgium
1944 disestablishments in France
German occupation of Belgium during World War II
German occupation of France during World War II